East Cambridgeshire (locally known as East Cambs) is a local government district in Cambridgeshire, England. Its council is based in Ely. The population of the District Council at the 2011 Census was 83,818. The district was formed on 1 April 1974 with the merger of Ely Urban District, Ely Rural District, and Newmarket Rural District. The district is divided into 14 electoral divisions, which return a total of 28 councillors. The council has been controlled by the Conservative Party since 2007.

Archaeology

The recent Fenland survey of archaeological finds mentions an enumeration of findings made between 1884 and 1994 in the region to the north of Devil's Dyke and Cambridge, from the Stone Age, the Bronze Age and the Iron Age (the region south of Devil's Dyke is not yet included in the survey). By far the greatest quantities of bronze objects found in England were discovered in East Cambridgeshire.

The most important Bronze Age finds were discovered in Isleham (more than 6500 pieces), Stuntney, Soham, Wicken, Chippenham, Coveney, Mepal and Wilburton. These findings include swords, spear-heads, arrows, axes, palstaves, knives, daggers, rapiers, armour, decorative equipment (in particular for horses) and many fragments of sheet bronze. The greater part of these objects have been entrusted to the Moyse's Hall Museum in Bury St Edmunds while other items are in the University of Cambridge Museum of Archaeology and Anthropology in Cambridge. Other finds include traces of cremations and barrows, golden torques, an extensive ditch system and a wooden track-way between Fordey Farm (Barway) and Little Thetford. Bronze razors have also been found and it is well known that Celts shaved their cheeks.

Settlements in East Cambridgeshire 

Aldreth
Ashley
Barway
Bottisham
Brinkley
Burwell
Chettisham
Cheveley
Chippenham
Coveney
Dullingham
Ely (City)
Fordham
Haddenham
Isleham
Little Downham
Little Thetford
Littleport
Lode
Longmeadow
Mepal
Prickwillow
Pymoor
Queen Adelaide
Reach
Soham (Town)
Stetchworth
Stretham
Stuntney
Sutton
Swaffham Bulbeck
Swaffham Prior
Upware
Wicken
Wilburton
Witcham
Witchford
Woodditton

See also
East Cambridgeshire local elections
Isleham Hoard
Mereham

References

 
Non-metropolitan districts of Cambridgeshire